The President pro tempore of the Oklahoma Senate is the second-highest-ranking official of the Oklahoma Senate and the highest-ranking state senator. The Oklahoma Constitution designates the Lieutenant Governor of Oklahoma as the highest-ranking official, serving ex officio as President of the Senate, even though the lieutenant governor only votes in the case of a tie. During the lieutenant governor's absence, the president pro tempore presides over sessions. By longstanding custom, the lieutenant governor presides over sessions devoted to ceremonial purposes, while the bulk of the legislative management and political power is reserved for the president pro tempore, who is elected directly by the Oklahoma Senate. 

The office of president pro tempore was created upon the ratification of the state constitution in 1907. The president pro tempore is popularly elected by the state senators, unlike the custom of the United States Senate where the most senior senator in the majority party serves as president pro tempore. As of 2013, every Oklahoma president pro tempore has been a member of the majority party, though it is not a constitutional requirement.

The president pro tempore is second in gubernatorial line of succession in Oklahoma, behind the lieutenant governor. The president pro tempore’s counterpart in the lower house of the Oklahoma Legislature is the Speaker of the Oklahoma House of Representatives.

Powers and duties

Although the president pro tempore is not the only state senator that can serve as a presiding officer, he holds the power to assign the presiding officer in his absence. During session, the presiding officer controls the flow of debate on the Oklahoma Senate floor, decides questions of order, seats the chamber, calls members to order for violating rules, and approves claims for supplies and services. The president pro tempore is responsible for maintaining decorum and enforcing the rules. The lieutenant governor presides over session in ceremonial instances such as the governor's State of the State speech. On the floor of the Oklahoma Senate, the presiding officer is always addressed as "Mister President" regardless of whether or not he is in fact the senate president or president pro tempore.

The president pro tempore designates the number of committees and appoints committee leadership and membership and determines bill assignment to committees and is an ex officio voting member that can participate in committee votes.

As a state senator, the president pro tempore is entitled to participate in debate and to vote.

The state legislature may be called into special session by a written call signed by two-thirds of the members of the Oklahoma Senate and two-thirds of the members of the Oklahoma House of Representatives. Once conditions are met, the call is filed with the president pro tempore and the speaker who must issue a join order for the convening of the special session.

According to Section 16 of Article Six of the Oklahoma Constitution, the president pro tempore is second in the gubernatorial line of succession behind the lieutenant governor.

History

Democratic control (1907-2007)
Henry S. Johnston, of Perry, was sworn into office as the first president pro tempore on November 16, 1907, the same day Oklahoma was admitted U.S. state. He served a single term and was replaced by J. C. Graham in 1909.

For its first 60 years, no one person ever held the office for more than one term consecutively. Tom Anglin of Holdenville, Oklahoma, was the first to hold the office a second time, serving from 1923 to 1925 and again from 1943 to 1945. Clem McSpadden was the first president pro tempore to serve two consecutive terms, from 1965 to 1969.

From 1965 to 2006, ten state senators have been selected to serve as president pro tempore over the 41-year period that would have allowed for the election of 22 presidents pro tempore. Of those ten, only James E. Hamilton of Poteau, Oklahoma, and Cal Hobson of Lexington, Oklahoma, served only one full single term. Hamilton was an unsuccessful candidate for the United States Senate in 1980, and he eventually returned to politics as a state representative, where he chaired the appropriations committee. Hobson won reelection to the office of president pro tempore, but resigned shortly thereafter when the Oklahoma Senate Democratic Caucus voted to allow him to resign or be ousted due to alcohol abuse during the 2005 legislative session. After completing his treatment for alcoholism, Hobson sought unsuccessfully to be the Democratic nominee for Lieutenant Governor of Oklahoma in 2006.

Four presidents pro tempore have served two consecutive terms and two have served three consecutive terms. As of 2013, Stratton Taylor holds the record of four consecutive terms. Taylor held the office for eight years, 1995 to 2003, serving as the president pro tempore under the entire administration of Governor Frank Keating.

Evenly divided (2007-2009)

Following the 2006 elections, the number of state senators was split evenly between the two major political parties; there were 24 Democratic senators and 24 Republican senators. The election of Democratic candidate Jari Askins as the Lieutenant Governor of Oklahoma, the ex officio President of the Senate, gave the Oklahoma Senate Democrats a single-vote majority.

The Oklahoma Constitution specifically states that only one state senator can be elected as president pro tempore. To address the historic tie, a power sharing agreement was reached that created the "co-president pro tempore."  Under this agreement, Democratic State Senator Mike Morgan of Stillwater served as the president pro tempore of the Senate and Republican State Senator Glenn Coffee of Oklahoma City served as co-president pro tempore. Coffee switched places with Morgan for one month, July 2007, to symbolize the unity between the two parties. While Coffee held the office of president pro tempore in July, Morgan served as the co-president pro tempore. 

Morgan and Coffee took turns presiding over the Oklahoma Senate and, under the agreement, Morgan only had appointment authority as long as Coffee assented to the appointment, effectively making them both fully vested with the duties and rights of president pro tempore. Additionally, under the agreement, should the Governor of Oklahoma and Lieutenant Governor of Oklahoma both have been absent from the state, Morgan would have served as the acting governor except for the one month of July, 2007.

Republican control (2009-present)
Following the 2008 elections, the Republicans won control of the Senate for the first time in state history, with 26 Republicans and 22 Democrats. They selected Glenn Coffee to serve as the first full President pro tempore who served from 2009-2011 when he was term-limited out and was selected to serve as Secretary of State in Governor Mary Fallin's administration. Brian Bingman served as President pro tempore from 2011 to 2017, and was succeeded by the current President Pro Tempore, Mike Schulz in 2017.

List of presidents pro tempore
The complete list of presidents pro tempore is below. Note: All locations are in Oklahoma.

See also
1st Oklahoma Legislature

References

External links
Oklahoma Senate

Oklahoma Legislature
Chairs of subnational legislatures